Delta is an unincorporated community in Stokes County, North Carolina, United States.

Unincorporated communities in Stokes County, North Carolina
Unincorporated communities in North Carolina